Petrophila heppneri is a moth in the family Crambidae. It was described by André Blanchard and Edward C. Knudson in 1983. It is found in North America, where it has been recorded from Texas.

References

Petrophila
Moths described in 1983